Mycobacterium senegalense is a species of Mycobacterium.

It is closely related to Mycobacterium farcinogenes.

References

External links
Type strain of Mycobacterium senegalense at BacDive -  the Bacterial Diversity Metadatabase

senegalense